Major General John Biddle (February 2, 1859 – January 18, 1936) was a career United States Army officer who became superintendent of the United States Military Academy.

Early life
Biddle was born in Detroit, Michigan. His father was William Shepard Biddle (1830–1902) and mother was Susan Dayton Ogden (1831–1878). His Biddle family included many political and military leaders, including grandfather John Biddle (1792–1859) and great-grandfather Charles Biddle (1745–1821). His maternal great-grandfather, Aaron Ogden, served as governor of New Jersey. His maternal grandfather, Elias B. D. Ogden, served as  associate justice of the New Jersey Supreme Court.

His siblings were Dr. Andrew P. Biddle, First Lieutenant William S. Biddle Jr. and Eliza (Lily) Biddle, wife of Episcopal Bishop G. Mott Williams.

Biddle was raised outside the United States until he was a teenager, and he attended schools in Geneva and Heidelberg. He then attended the University of Michigan for a year, where he became a member of Delta Kappa Epsilon fraternity, but left to attend the United States Military Academy. He graduated in 1881, ranked second of 53. His high class ranking earned him a second lieutenant's commission in the first choice of most top graduates, the Corps of Engineers.

Military career

Biddle was commissioned an engineer. Biddle was in charge of river and harbor work at Nashville, Tennessee from 1891 to 1898. When the Spanish–American War broke out, he became Chief Engineer of Volunteers, serving in Puerto Rico, Cuba, and the Philippines. He was awarded the Silver Star. From 1901 to 1907 he was Engineer-Commissioner in charge of public works in Washington, D.C. Subsequently, he was in charge of river and harbor work in San Francisco from 1907 to 1911 and then served as an observer with the Austro-Hungarian Army on the Eastern Front from November 1914 to June 1915. He then was in charge of river and harbor improvements in Baltimore, Maryland. Biddle served as the superintendent of the US Military Academy at West Point from July 1916 to June 1917. When the United States entered World War I, he commanded a brigade of engineer regiments, then served as acting United States Army Chief of Staff in Washington while Chief of Staff Tasker Bliss was in London. In 1918 he was again sent overseas to take charge of American troops in Great Britain and Ireland.

Death
Biddle died in San Antonio, Texas after a long illness.

His nephew William Shepard Biddle III (1900–1981), rose to be major general after commanding the 113th Cavalry Regiment in World War II, and the 11th Constabulary Regiment in the German occupation.

Awards and decorations
United Kingdom
Royal Victorian Order (commander) (1919)
Order of the Bath (knight commander) (1918)

United States
Army Distinguished Service Medal
Silver Star

The citation for his Army DSM reads:

References

Bibliography

External links

1859 births
1936 deaths
Military personnel from Detroit
John
United States Military Academy alumni
University of Michigan alumni
Superintendents of the United States Military Academy
Burials at West Point Cemetery
Honorary Knights Commander of the Order of the Bath
Recipients of the Silver Star
United States Army generals of World War I
United States Army Corps of Engineers personnel
United States Army generals
Recipients of the Distinguished Service Medal (US Army)